Mailua is a settlement in Kenya's Rift Valley Province.

Populated places in Kajiado County